Randy Stewart Rainbow (born July 6, 1981) is an American comedian and singer, best known for spoof interviews that blend political satire and musical parodies from a liberal perspective.

Early life 
Randy Rainbow was born to a Jewish family in Huntington, New York. Rainbow is his real last name. He grew up in Commack, New York. When he was 10 years old, his father, Gerry Rainbow (né Ribner), a musician and talent booker, moved the family to Plantation, Florida. Rainbow credits his grandmother as his greatest comedic influence. In a 2017 interview with The New York Times, he recalled "It was really my grandmother who was the biggest influence because she'd talk back to the celebrities and politicians on TV. She was a combination of Joan Rivers, Elaine Stritch, Betty White, and Bea Arthur rolled into one." After dropping out of community college in his early 20s, Rainbow moved back to New York to pursue a theatrical career. It was then he began blogging and making comedic videos.

Career

Blog 
Rainbow created his blog, The Randy Rainbow Bloggity BLAHg-BLAHg, to document his theatrical experiences and "kvetch about my day-to-day as a single homo in the city."

Celebrity videos 
In his early work, Rainbow stages fake phone conversations with famous people by editing real audio clips of those celebrities. He posted his breakout video, "Randy Rainbow is Dating Mel Gibson" in 2010. It received more than 60,000 views in one week and has since surpassed 275,000 views. Subsequent videos include "Randy Rainbow Calls Lindsay Lohan", "Randy Rainbow Calls Dr. Laura", "The Morning After Chelsea's Wedding", "Randy Rainbow Gets a Job (from Rachel Zoe?)", "Randy Rainbow Kicks It with Kanye West", and "Randy Rainbow Spends Christmas with Mel Gibson". Michael Urie appeared as himself in "Randy Rainbow Getting Married?" Tituss Burgess appeared as himself in "Randy Rainbow Stars in a Show!" Brent Corrigan appeared as himself in "Randy Rainbow Makes a Sex Tape (w/Mel Gibson)". Rainbow's cat Mushi has also appeared in some of his videos.

Rainbow's videos have been featured on a number of blogs. Popular LGBT blogs Towleroad and Queerty have reposted many of his videos since "Randy Rainbow is Dating Mel Gibson". His Lohan clip was featured by Perez Hilton. Rainbow made a guest appearance in Tituss and the Tightass Band, a 2010 benefit concert for The Trevor Project at New World Stages. He also made a guest appearance in the third annual Living for Today benefit concert at the Laurie Beechman Theatre. Rainbow appeared on the cover of Out Front Colorado.

Political videos 
Rainbow gained a larger audience and shifted focus during the 2016 American presidential campaign, with a series of spoof interviews and musical parodies skewering the election process and the candidates, especially Donald Trump, who became Rainbow's primary subject following his nomination by the Republican party and subsequent election. Among the musical parodies he has done about politics are:

Filmography

Musical career 

Rainbow has released several recordings on Broadway Records. He released three singles in August 2012: an original jingle for Chick-fil-A written while he was employed there, a cover of "An Old-Fashioned Wedding," and a parody of "Born This Way" called "Born This Gay."

He released the holiday EP Hey Gurl, It's Christmas! on November 8, 2019, featuring a studio version of "Trump's Favorite Things"; the title track is an original song.

Following the launch of his Pink Glasses Tour, Rainbow released his debut studio album A Little Brains, A Little Talent on October 29, 2021. The album includes several studio versions of his YouTube parodies, plus the two original songs "Pink Glasses," and "Randy Rainbow For President!" both co-written by Rainbow. The album also features a studio version of "The Jitterbug," a scrapped song from The Wizard of Oz, and two bonus tracks: "If Donald Got Fired" (featuring Patti LuPone) and "Mr. Biden (Bring My Vaccine)."

Awards and nominations 
Rainbow was nominated for a Primetime Emmy Award for Outstanding Short Form Variety Series in 2019 and 2020.

After Primetime Emmy Award categories were combined starting in 2021 to form the Outstanding Short Form Comedy, Drama or Variety Series, The Randy Rainbow Show was nominated in 2021 and again in 2022.

The album "A Little Brains, A Little Talent" was nominated for the Grammy Award for Best Comedy Album at the 65th Annual Grammy Awards.

Personal life 
Rainbow is Jewish and openly gay. He was born on Long Island, lived in Queens for 17 years, attended community college in Plantation, Florida, and since July 2019 has resided in Manhattan.

On April 19, 2022, Rainbow published a memoir, "Playing With Myself", which tells the story of his personal life and rise to internet fame.

Controversy 
In mid-August 2020, critics of Randy Rainbow circulated several dozen of his tweets, all but a few published between 2010 and 2012, featuring jokes widely described as racist and transphobic. Rainbow apologized on August 20, 2020, in an interview with The Advocate.

References

External links
 
 
 

1981 births
Living people
American bloggers
LGBT Jews
LGBT YouTubers
Gay comedians
American LGBT singers
People from Long Island
People from Plantation, Florida
LGBT people from New York (state)
LGBT people from Florida
21st-century American comedians
21st-century American singers
21st-century American male singers
American male comedians
Singers from New York (state)
Singers from Florida
American gay musicians
American gay writers
Jewish singers
Jewish American male comedians
20th-century American LGBT people
21st-century American LGBT people
21st-century American Jews
American LGBT comedians